Sangeet Natak Akademi (The National Academy of Music, Dance and Drama in English) is the national level academy for performing arts set up by the Government of India.

History
It was set up by the Indian education ministry on 31 May 1952 and became functional the following year, with the appointment of its first chairman, Dr. P. V. Rajamannar. Dr Rajendra Prasad, the first President of India,  inaugurated it on 28 January 1953 in a special function held in the Parliament House. The academy's Fellowship and Award are considered very prestigious.

Functions

The academy functions as the apex body of the performing arts in the country to preserve and promote the vast cultural heritage of India expressed in music, dance and drama. It also works with governments and art academies in states and territories of the country.

SNA established several institutions over the years:
  Manipur Dance Academy, Imphal
 Sattriya Centre
 Kathak Kendra (National Institute of Kathak Dance), New Delhi in 1964
 Ravindra Rangshala
Centers:
 Centre for Kutiyattam, Thiruvananthapuram, a national projects in the support of Koodiyattam (the age-old Sanskrit theatre of Kerala)
 Chhau Centre, Baripada/ Jamshedpur
 Northeast Centre

In addition, the Akademi
Subsidizes the work of institutions engaged in teaching, performing or promoting music, dance, or theatre
Gives grants to aid research, documentation and publishing in the performing arts
Organises and subsidises seminars and conferences of subject specialists
Documents and records the performing arts for its audio-visual archive
Renders advice and assistance to the government of India in the task of formulating and implementing policies and programmes in the field
Carries a part of the responsibilities of the state for fostering cultural contacts between regions in the country, as well as between India and the world
Organises its annual festival of music, dance and theatre in NCT Delhi.

The facilities
The academy is an important source of information and offers the following facilities.

The audio-visual archive
The academy's audio-visual archive has several audio/video tapes, photographs and films. It is the largest archive of its kind in the country and is extensively drawn upon for research on the performing arts of India.

The library
The academy maintains a reference library consisting of about 22,000 books.

Books on several subjects including Dance, Drama, Music, Theatre, Sociology, Folklore, Tribal Studies, Indian History and Culture, Indian Art, Religion and Epics, Mythology, Anthropology and Reference works such as Encyclopedias, Dictionaries, Yearbooks, Bibliographies, Indexes and Newspaper clippings about Academy Awards and eminent artistes in the field of performing arts, can be found here.

Gallery of musical instruments
The academy has a museum-cum-gallery of musical instruments in Bhapang vadan, New Delhi. There are more than 200 musical instruments on display here.

Documentation unit
It has a documentation unit that collects and records works of masters in the field of music, dance and theatre on audio and video to help researchers. The academy produces several in-house publications.

Award and Fellowship

Sangeet Natak Akademi Award
The Sangeet Natak Akademi Award is the highest national recognition given to practicing artists, gurus and scholars. It carries a purse money of Rs. 1,00,000/-, a shawl, and a tamrapatra (a brass plaque).  The number of awards given annually is 33 at present and, till date, over 1000 artists have been honoured.

Sangeet Natak Akademi Fellowship, Ratna Sadsya
Each year the Academy awards Sangeet Natak Akademi Fellowships, Ratna Sadsya, to distinguished individuals for their contribution to the field of arts, music, dance and theatre. The first Fellow of the Akademi was elected in 1954, and till date, the Akademi has honoured 123 eminent personalities as Akademi Fellows (Akademi Ratna).

Ustad Bismillah Khan Yuva Puraskar 
Instituted in 2006, in memory of Ustad Bismillah Khan, this award is given to young artists (below 40 years of age) for their talent in the fields of music, dance and drama.

Tagore Ratna and Tagore Puraskar
On the occasion of the commemoration of the 150th birth anniversary of Rabindranath Tagore Sangeet Natak Akademi Tagore Ratna and Sangeet Natak Akademi Tagore Puraskar were conferred. These awards were given at events in Kolkata – Sangeet Natak Akademi Tagore Samman on 25 April 2012 and in Chennai Sangeet Natak Akademi Tagore Samman on 2 May 2012.

Indian classical dances
The Sangeet Natak Akademi confers awards on nine Indian classical dance forms:
Bharatanatyam: originating in Tamil Nadu
Kathak: originating in Northern India
Kathakali: originating in Kerala, performed by men
Kuchipudi: originating in Andhra Pradesh
Manipuri: originating in Manipur
Mohiniaattam: originating in Kerala, performed by women
Odissi: originating in Odisha
Sattriya: originating in Assam
Chhau: originating in Jharkhand, Odisha and West Bengal

See also
Lalit Kala Akademi: equivalent national academy for visual arts
Sahitya Akademi: equivalent national academy for literature
Sangeet Nataka Akademi organised the First Film Seminar in 1955 in Delhi, inaugurated by Pandit Nehru
List of Sangeet Natak Akademi Tagore Ratna and Tagore Puraskar Recipient

References

External links
The official website of the Sangeet Natak Akademi
 List of Awardees – Sangeet Natak Akademi
, article on 50th anniversary
Data Bank on Traditional/Folk performances
Current events page on the website (slightly outdated)
The Academy's Official List of Award winners
Carnatic India: a portal on Indian classical fine arts
Akdemi Music

 
Drama schools in India
Music education in India
Performing arts education in India
Arts organisations based in Delhi
Arts organizations established in 1952
1952 establishments in India